Bulbophyllum forrestii is a species of orchid in the genus Bulbophyllum in section Cirrhopetalum. It was named in honour of George Forrest (1873-1932).

References
The Bulbophyllum-Checklist
The Internet Orchid Species Photo Encyclopedia

forrestii